Events from the year 1605 in art.

Events
 (unknown)

Paintings

 Caravaggio
Christ on the Mount of Olives
Ecce Homo
Saint Jerome in Meditation
Madonna and Child with St. Anne (Dei Palafrenieri)
 Domenichino (c.1604–05)
Landscape with fishermen, hunters and washerwomen (Christ Church Picture Gallery, Oxford)
Landscape with Fording (Doria Pamphilj Gallery, Rome)
Portrait of Cardinal Girolamo Agucchi (Uffizi, Florence)
A Virgin with a Unicorn (Palazzo Farnese, Rome; fresco to a design by Carracci)
 Nicholas Hilliard - miniature portrait of Charles, Lord Howard of Effingham
 Guido Reni - David with the Head of Goliath
 Peter Paul Rubens - The Fall of Phaeton (approximate date of original completion)
 Joachim Wtewael - The Judgement of Paris (approximate date)
 Domenico Zampieri - portrait of Cardinal Agucchi

Births
February 17 - Luca Ferrari, Italian painter (died 1654)
May 29 - Hendrick van Anthonissen, Dutch marine painter (died 1656)
August - Ercole Procaccini the Younger, Italian painter of altarpieces, later director of the academy established by the Procaccini (died 1675/1680)
date unknown
Ottavio Amigoni, Italian painter, active in Brescia (died 1661)
Jacopo Baccarini – Italian painter of the Baroque period born in Reggio Emilia (died 1682)
Carlo Biffi, Italian painter (died 1675)
Carlo Bozzoni, Italian painter (died 1657)
Carlo Cornara, Italian painter born in Milan (died 1673)
Francesco Cozza, Italian painter (died 1682)
Pedro de Camprobín, Spanish painter of animals, fruit, and flowers (died 1674)
Felice Ficherelli, Italian painter active in Tuscany (died 1660)
Girolamo Forabosco, Italian painter (died 1679)
Pietro Liberi, Italian painter nicknamed il Libertino (died 1687)
Francesco Maffei, Italian painter characterized by provincial stylistic quirks (died 1660)
Pierre Patel ("le bon Patel"), French Baroque era painter (died 1676)
Cheng Sui, Chinese landscape painter during the Ming Dynasty (died 1691)
probable
Adriaen Brouwer, Flemish genre painter (died 1638)
Pedro de Campolargo, Flemish-born Spanish painter and engraver (died 1675)
Dirk van Delen, Dutch Baroque Era painter (died 1671)
Luigi Primo, Flemish painter of portraits and altarpieces (died 1667)
Bartolommeo Scaligero, Italian painter (date of death unknown)
1605-1610: Abraham Willemsens, Flemish painter of history and genre paintings (died 1672)

Deaths
February 11 - Stradanus, Flanders-born mannerist painter (born 1523)
March 17 - Pieter Bast, Dutch cartographer, engraver and draftsman (born 1550)
date unknown
Cristofano dell'Altissimo, Italian painter primarily working in Florence (born 1525)
Biagio Betti, Italian painter (born 1535)
Giovanni Contarini, Venetian painter (born 1549)
Giacomo Lauro, Italian painter (born 1550)
Gregorio Pagani, Italian painter active mainly in Florence (born 1558)
Felice Riccio, Italian painter (born 1542)
Giacomo Rocca, Italian painter (born 1592)
probable - Leonard Fryer, sergeant-painter to Queen Elizabeth I of England (date of birth unknown)

 
Years of the 17th century in art
1600s in art